Saint-Joachim-de-Shefford is a municipality in the Canadian province of Quebec, located within La Haute-Yamaska Regional County Municipality. The population as of the Canada 2021 Census was 1,476.

Demographics

Population
Population trend:

Language
Mother tongue language (2021)

See also
List of municipalities in Quebec

References

Municipalities in Quebec
Incorporated places in La Haute-Yamaska Regional County Municipality